PMI (Picture Music International) was a division of EMI that specialised in music video releases for EMI artists. Releases included videos from the Beatles, Kate Bush, Cliff Richard, Pet Shop Boys, Queen, Pink Floyd and Duran Duran, as well as Iron Maiden and Queensrÿche.  It has been succeeded by Abbey Road Interactive.

EMI